Takurō, Takuro, Takurou or Takuroh (written: , , , , ,  or ) is a masculine Japanese given name. Notable people with the name include:

, Japanese musician
, Japanese swimmer
, Japanese baseball player
, Japanese footballer
, Japanese footballer
, Japanese voice actor
, Japanese rugby union player
, Japanese footballer
, Japanese speed skater
, Japanese footballer
, Japanese actor
, Japanese engineer
, Japanese mathematician
, Japanese footballer
, Japanese ice hockey player
, Japanese singer-songwriter

Japanese masculine given names